Australia hosted the 1938 British Empire Games in Sydney, New South Wales and their team was abbreviated AUS. This was their third of 3 Commonwealth Games meets.

Medalists

1938 Australian Team & Results

Athletics (Men)

Javelin Throw
 John Patrick 'Jack' Metcalfe – 3rd, 182 ft 2in
 James Barlow – 5th, 169 ft 0in
 Goode, David P – 6th, 165 ft 1 in
 Sheiles, Bert – 7th, 163 ft 10in

Discus Throw
 Harold B Wilson – 4th, 133 ft 2 3/
 Keith W Pardon – 5th, 130 ft 4in
 William R MacKenzie – 6th, 128 ft 11in
 Button, Adrian – 7th, 125 ft 8in

Shot Put
 Drew, Francis – 3rd, 45 ft 3in
 William C Plummer – 4th, 44 ft 5in
 Harold B Wilson – 5th, 43 ft 3in
 William R MacKenzie – 6th, 42 ft 1in

Hammer Throw
 Keith W Pardon – 2nd, 148 ft 1in
 McNamara, Patrick – 4th, 139 ft 9in
 Rosenblum, Myer E – 5th, 135 ft 9in
 Graham, Leslie – 6th, 131 ft 5in

Pole Vault
 Fletcher, Leslie A – 2nd, 13 ft 0in
 Winter, Edwin J – 5th, 12 ft 9 in
 Frederick Irvine Woodhouse – 7th, 12 ft 4in
 Cartwright, William – 8th, 11 ft 6 in

Long Jump
 Raymond G Graf – 7th, 22 ft 6 in

Broad Jump
 Basil C Dickenson – 3rd, 23 ft 5in
 Gould, Henry 'Harry' T – 4th, 23 ft 4in
 John Patrick 'Jack' Metcalfe – 5th, 23 ft 2in

Hop, Step, Jump
 John Patrick 'Jack' Metcalfe – 1st, 50 ft 10 in
 Miller, D Lloyd – 2nd, 50 ft 6in
 Basil C Dickenson – 3rd, 50 ft 1in
 Raymond G Graf – 4th, 47 ft 11in

High Jump
 Heffernan, Robert – 2nd, 6 ft 2 in
 Shetliffe, Douglas F – 3rd, 6 ft 2 in
 Tancred, Peter L – 4th, 6 ft 1in 4in
 John Patrick 'Jack' Metcalfe – 7th, 5 ft 11in

100 yards
 John Mumford – 2nd, 9.8 sec (heat 10.0, semi 10.1)
 Edward W Best – 3rd, 9.9 sec (heat 10.0, semi 10.0)
 T Edward Hampson – 5th, 10.0 sec (heat 10.1, semi 10.1)
 Howard Spencer Yates – 6th, 10.1 sec (heat 10.1, semi 10.2)

220 yards
 John Mumford – 2nd, 21.3 sec (heat 21.6, semi 21.6)
 Edward W Best – 3rd, 21.4 sec (heat 21.6, semi 21.4)
 T Edward Hampson – 4th, 21.6 sec (semi) (heat 22.1)
 Howard Spencer Yates – 5th, 21.7 sec (heat 22.0, semi 21.4)

440 yards
 Athol H Jones – 3rd, 49.8 sec (heat)
 John Mumford – 4th, 48.3 (heat)
 Hugh Johnson – 4th (heat)
 Scott, Francis – 4th (heat)

880 yards
 Maxwell Fleming – 6th (heat)
 Goff, Leslie – 6th (heat)
 Gerald I Backhouse – 7th, 1:55.1 (heat)
 Chappel, Roy – 7th (heat)

1-mile
 Gerald I Backhouse – 2nd, 4:12.2 (heat 4:18.0)
 Maxwell Fleming – 5th (heat)
 Frederick Barry-Brown – 6th (heat)
 Bonham, Donald – 7th (heat)

3 miles
 Nicholls, Stanley E – 5th, 14:30.0
 Colman, Frederick – Did not finish
 Faulkner, Keith – Did not finish
 Weightman, Walter – Did not finish

6 miles
 Fred Bassed – 8th
 Millington, Stanley – 9th
 Doyle, Brendan – 10th

120 yards Hurdles
 Stenner, Sydney G – 3rd, 14.4 sec (heat 14.5)
 McLardy, Donald F – 4th, 14.6 sec (heat 14.9)
 Wilson, George – 4th, 15.1 sec (heat)
 Popplewell, Frederick – 4th (heat)

440 yards Hurdles
 John F Park – 2nd, 54.6 sec
 McDougall, Alan – 3rd, 55.2 sec
 Alfred J Watson – 4th
 Magee, Paul F – 6th

4x110 yards Relay
 Edward W Best – 3rd, 41.9 sec
 T Edward Hampson – 3rd, 41.9 sec
 Alfred J Watson – 3rd, 41.9 sec
 Howard Spencer Yates – 3rd, 41.9 sec

4x440 yards Relay
 Athol H Jones – 4th
 Hugh Johnson – 4th
 John F Park – 4th
 Wallace, Vernon – 4th
 Lewis, Maurice – Did not compete (reserve)

Marathon
 Crossley, Richard J – 8th, 3:12:50.0
 Wood, John – 9th, 3:19:47.0
 Hayes, Alfred – Did not finish
 Jolly, Ernest – Did not finish
 Liddle, William – Did not finish
 Patterson, James – Did not finish

Athletics (Women)

High Jump
 Carter, Doris – 5th, 5 ft 1 in
 Poore, Elsie – 6th, 4 ft 8 in

Broad Jump
 Decima Norman – 1st, 19 ft 1/4in (GR)
 Thelma Peake – 3rd, 18 ft 2in
 Evans, Enid – 10th 15 ft 10in
 Nell Gould – 12th 14 ft 9in

Javelin Throw
 Jones, Elsie – 5th, 101 ft 8 in
 Mitchell, Lena – 6th, 100 ft 3 in
 Clarice Kennedy – 7th, 97 ft 3in

100 yards
 Decima Norman – 1st, 11.1 sec (GR)
 Walker, Joyce – 2nd, 11.3 sec (heat 11.4, semi 11.4)
 Joan Woodland – 5th, 11.5 sec (heat 11.5, semi 11.2)
 Thelma Peake – (semi) Disqualified (heat 11.5)

220 yards
 Decima Norman – 1st, 24.7 sec (heat 24.9, semi 24.5 (GR))
 Jean Coleman – 2nd, 25.1 sec (heat 25.3, semi 25.2)
 A Eileen Wearne – 3rd, 25.3 sec (heat 25.1, semi 25.2)
 Talbot, Irene – 6th (heat 25.7, semi 25.4)

440 yards Medley Relay
 Jean Coleman – 1st, 49.1 sec
 Decima Norman – 1st, 49.1 sec
 A Eileen Wearne – 1st, 49.1 sec

660 yards Medley Relay
 Jean Coleman – 1st, 1:15.2
 Decima Norman – 1st, 1:15.2
 Thelma Peake – 1st, 1:15.2
 Joan Woodland – 1st, 1:15.2

80 m Hurdles
 Grant, Isabel – 2nd, 11.7 sec (heat 12.1)
 Clarice Kennedy – 4th (heat 12.2)
 Thelma Peake – 5th (heat 12.4)
 Nell Gould – 4th (heat)

Bowls
Singles
 Jack Low – 3rd

Pairs
 Percy Hutton – 2nd
 Howard Mildren – 2nd

Fours
 Tom Kinder – 3rd
 Charlie H McNeill – 3rd
 Aubrey Murray – 3rd
 H Frank Murray – 3rd

Boxing
 Trevor Law – Flyweight (up to 51 kg) – Eliminated
 Jack B Dillon – Bantamweight (up to 54 kg) – 3rd
 Leonard Schluter – Featherweight (up to 57 kg) – Eliminated
 I Ellis – Lightweight (up to 60 kg) – Eliminated
 William Smith – Welterweight (up to 67 kg) – 1st
 Athol Stubbs – Middleweight (up to 75 kg) – Eliminated
 Leslie Harley – Heavyweight (up to 91 kg) – 3rd
 Cecil G Overell – Light-Heavyweight (up to 81 kg) – 2nd

Cycling
10 miles
 Fred Ashby – 4th
 John Molloy – unplaced
 Charlie E Wright – unplaced
 Sh. Janki Das – first Indian cyclist

100 km Road Race
 Fred Hines – 6th
 Harold Clayton – unplaced
 Alick Yuille – unplaced

1,000 m Sprint
 Edgar Laurence 'Dunc' Gray – 1st, 13.6 sec
 Robert Porter – 2nd
 Tasman Johnson – unplaced

1,000 m Time Trial
 Robert Porter – 1st, 1:15.2 (GR)
 Tasman Johnson – 2nd, 1:15.7
 Edgar Laurence 'Dunc' Gray – 5th, 1:16.5

Rowing
Eight
 William G Thomas (bow), 2nd
 Alfred J Gregory (stroke) – 2nd
 Doug K Bowden (cox) – 2nd
 Frank A W le Souef (2) – 2nd
 Gordon H Yewers (3) – 2nd
 Richard L Paramor (4) – 2nd
 Edward R Bromley (5) – 2nd
 William G Dixon (6) – 2nd
 Ainslie B 'Joe' Gould (7) – 2nd
 John Chester (reserve) – Did not compete
 R B Scott (reserve) – Did not compete

Single Scull
 Herbert J Turner – 1st, 8:24.0 (won by 5 lengths)

Double Scull
 William F Bradley (bow) – 1st, 7:29.4
 Cecil A Pearce (stroke) – 1st, 7:29.4

Coxed Four
 Gordon Freeth (bow) – 1st, 7:16.8
 Jack T Fisher (stroke) – 1st, 7:16.8
 H F Kerr (cox) – 1st, 7:16.8
 Don H Fraser (2) – 1st, 7:16.8
 Stewart J Elder (3) – 1st, 7:16.8
 Max Gaskin (reserve)
 John Edward Suffren (reserve)

Swimming (Men)

110 yd Freestyle
 William Fleming – 3rd, 1:01.0 (heat 1:01.8)
 Percy Charles Oliver – 6th, 1:03.1 (heat)
 J Robert Wilshire – 7th, 1:01.6 (heat 1:01.4)

440 yd Freestyle
 H Robin Biddulph – 3rd, 4:55.4 (heat 5:01.5)
 Robert Newbiggen – 5th, 5:19.8 (heat)
 Noel Phillip Ryan – 7th, 5:20.4 (heat 5:19.0)

1,650 yd Freestyle
 H Robin Biddulph – 5th, 20:42.2 (heat 21:07.2)
 Noel Phillip Ryan – 6th, 21:08.2 (heat 21:06.6)
 Robert Newbiggen – Did not finish

4x220 yd Freestyle Relay
 H Robin Biddulph – 3rd, 9:32.9 (split 2:18.8)
 William Fleming – 3rd, 9:32.9 (split 2:26.8)
 Noel Phillip Ryan – 3rd, 9:32.9 (split 2:24.6)
 J Robert Wilshire – 3rd, 9:32.9 (split 2:27.7)

3x110 yd Medley Relay
 William Fleming – 3rd, 3:31.8 (split 1:01.6)
 Ernest A Hobbs – 3rd, 3:31.8 (split 1:20.7)
 Percy Charles Oliver – 3rd, 3:31.8 (split 1:09.5)

220 yd Breaststroke
 Ray Cameron – 4th, 3:03.1 (heat 3:07.2)
 Ernest A Hobbs – 7th, 3:09.0 (heat 3:04.9)
 John Johnson – 5th, 3:03.6 (heat 3:07.8)

110 yd Backstroke
 Percy Charles Oliver – 1st, 1:07.9 (GR) (heat 1:09.6)
 Reginald Vaughan Clark – 4th, 1:18.3 (heat)
 Roth Bassingthwaite – 5th, 1:15.1 (heat)

Swimming (Women)
110 yd Freestyle
 Evelyn de Lacy – 1st, 1:10.1 (GR) (heat 1:10.6)
 Dorothy J Green – 2nd, 1:11.1 (heat 1:11.4)
 Margaret Rawson – 5th, 1:15.8 (heat)

110 yd Backstroke
 Gwen Millard – 4th, 1:27.5 (heat)
 Marion Nixon – 5th, 1:26.5 (heat)
 Patricia Norton – 1st, 1.19.5 (heat 1:20.6)

220 yd Breaststroke
 Margaret Dovey – 6th, 3:32.0
 Valerie George – 4th, 3:23.0
 Joan Thomas – 5th, 3:23.6

440 yd Freestyle
 Dorothy J Green – 1st, 5:39.9 (GR) (heat 5:43.0)
 Evelyn de Lacy – 5th, 5:59.4 (heat)
 Mynee Steel – 6th, 5:51.7 (heat 5:53.2)

4x110 yd Freestyle Relay
 Evelyn de Lacy – 2nd, 4:49.9
 Dorothy J Green – 2nd, 4:49.9
 Patricia Norton – 2nd, 4:49.9
 Margaret Rawson – 2nd, 4:49.9

3x110 yd Medley Relay
 Evelyn de Lacy – 3rd, 4:10.0 (split 1:12.9)
 Valerie George – 3rd, 4:10.0 (split 1:12.0)
 Patricia Norton – 3rd, 4:10.0 (split 1:20.1)

Diving (Men)
Springboard
 George Johnston – 4th, 111.39 points
 Ronald Masters – 1st, 126.36 points
 David J Norris – 5th, 110.62 points

Platform
 Ray Davis – 5th, 94.21 points
 Ronald Masters – 2nd, 102.87 points
 Arthur O'Connor – 4th, 97.39 points

Diving (Women)
Springboard
 Irene Donnett – 1st, 91.18 points
 Laurie Hawe – 4th, 75.32 points
 Janet Weidenhofer – 7th, 47.40 points

Platform
 Irene Donnett – 3rd, 34.57 points
 Lurline Hook – 1st, 36.47 points
 Pamela Hunt – 5th, 26.10 points

Wrestling
 Richard Edward 'Dick' Garrard – Lightweight (up to 68 kg) – 1st
 Todd Hardwick – Middleweight (up to 82 kg) – 2nd
 John Lambert 'Jack' Knight – Heavyweight (up to 100 kg) – 1st
 Edward Purcell – Bantamweight (up to 57 kg) – 1st
 Roy Purchase – Featherweight (up to 62 kg) – 1st
 Eddie Richard Scarf – Light Heavyweight (up to 90 kg) – 1st
 Tom Trevaskis – Welterweight (up to 74 kg) – 1st

Officials
Honorary Team Manager – Wilfred Selwyn Kent Hughes (VIC)
Athletics Manager – Wilfred Ernest Painter (VIC)
Athletics Manageress – Mrs Doris Magee (NSW)
Boxing & Wrestling Manager – Edgar Stephen Tanner (VIC)
Cycling Manager – C J 'Mick' Gray (VIC)
Rowing Manager – John Rook (NSW)
Rowing Coach – T K 'Toff' Qurban (SA)
Rowing Eights Coach – Sidney Raper (NSW)
Swimming Manager – Jack P Sheedy (WA)
Swimming Manageress – Katie Buckle (NSW)

See also
 Australia at the 1936 Summer Olympics

References

External links
Commonwealth Games Australia Results Database

1938
Nations at the 1938 British Empire Games
British Empire Games